Thelumusa Samuel Owen (born 14 April 1991), better known by his stage name Tellaman is a South African singer, songwriter and record producer. Growing up in a musical background, he is most known for a number one charting single by DJ Speedsta titled "Mayo" which features himself, Yung Swiss, Frank Casino & Shane Eagle.

Early life and career 
Tellaman was born and raised in Durban, South Africa. He is a self-taught musician whose interest in music was sparked by his mother, who had him singing at home, at church and in a youth choir. At the age of fifteen he decided to pursue music as a career and began writing and recording his own music.

Tellaman was signed and featured in Soul Candi Record's compilation album titled Sould Candi Sessions 15, alongside MoFlava, Lulo Café, Cueber and Hareal Salko. Tellaman's disc, titled Ntsikelelo, included hit singles "Drinks and Music" featuring Okmalumkoolkat and "Intoxicated" featuring Lastee. The album sales passed Gold status and it was nominated for the Best Compilation Award at the 2015 Metro FM Awards. In June 2016 his EP Mind Vs Heart was released, followed by another EP titled Lucid Dreams which was released in February 2017. On 18 May 2018, he signed a record deal with Universal Music South Africa, and released "No Sharing", on 13 July 2018, as his first official single under Universal Music South Africa.

On 1 February 2019, Tellaman released his fourth album God Decides, through Universal Music South Africa. Lead singles from the album, include: "No Sharing", "Crew Lit", and "Practice". On 29 November 2019, Tellman signed an  international deal with Motown Records and Virgin EMI Records. In May 2020, he signed a record deal with Def Jam Recordings Africa.

Discography

Albums

Singles

As lead artist 

List of singles as lead artist, with selected chart positions and certifications, showing yearreleased and album name

As featured artist

Awards and nominations

References

External links 
 Tellaman on Twitter

Living people
Musicians from Durban
South African singer-songwriters
South African record producers
1991 births